Das grüne Ungeheuer is a novel published in 1959 by East German author Wolfgang Schreyer. It is also the title of a five-episode miniseries adaptation from the book, produced in 1962 by film director Rudi Kurz for Deutscher Fernsehfunk.

External links
 

1962 films
Television in East Germany
1959 German novels
East German novels
Novels set in Guatemala
Novels set in the 1950s
German novels adapted into television shows
1960s German television miniseries
1962 German television series debuts
1962 German television series endings
German-language television shows
Television shows based on German novels
1960s German films